Graeme Thomson (born 31 July 1951) is a New Zealand former cricketer. He played 47 first-class and 13 List A matches for Otago between 1974 and 1981.

See also
 List of Otago representative cricketers

References

External links
 

1951 births
Living people
New Zealand cricketers
Otago cricketers
Cricketers from Invercargill
South Island cricketers